Periyakaruppur  is a village in the Srirangam taluk of Tiruchirappalli district in Tamil Nadu, India.

Demographics 

As per the 2001 census, Periyakaruppur had a population of 1,333 with 682 males and 651 females. The sex ratio was 955 and the literacy rate, 74.32.

References 

 

Villages in Tiruchirappalli district